Clostridium aurantibutyricum is a species of bacteria in the genus Clostridium.

References 

aurantibutyricum
Bacteria described in 1944